Kevin Finnegan (18 April 1948 – 23 October 2008) was an English boxer.

Finnegan's older brother Chris was an Olympic gold medalist and also a professional boxer. Early in his career when Kevin was still an amateur he was banned for 18 months for climbing into the ring to dispute a loss his brother had suffered. He was well known for a trilogy of fights against Alan Minter; although he lost all three, they were close point decisions.

He won the British Middleweight title on three occasions, and was a two-time European Middleweight champion. Finnegan twice fought future undisputed world champion Marvin Hagler, losing by a technical knockout on both occasions. Hagler later referred to Finnegan as the toughest man he had ever fought. He also held wins over Tony Sibson and Gratien Tonna. His career lasted from 1970 to 1980 and he had 47 fights, winning 35, losing 11 and drawing one.

Finnegan died of heart disease on 23 October 2008, at his home in Hillingdon.

Professional boxing record

|-
|align="center" colspan=8|35 Wins (13 knockouts, 22 decisions), 11 Losses (5 knockouts, 6 decisions), 1 Draw 
|-
| align="center" style="border-style: none none solid solid; background: #e3e3e3"|Result
| align="center" style="border-style: none none solid solid; background: #e3e3e3"|Record
| align="center" style="border-style: none none solid solid; background: #e3e3e3"|Opponent
| align="center" style="border-style: none none solid solid; background: #e3e3e3"|Type
| align="center" style="border-style: none none solid solid; background: #e3e3e3"|Round
| align="center" style="border-style: none none solid solid; background: #e3e3e3"|Date
| align="center" style="border-style: none none solid solid; background: #e3e3e3"|Location
| align="center" style="border-style: none none solid solid; background: #e3e3e3"|Notes
|-align=center
|Loss
|
|align=left|Matteo Salvemini
|PTS
|12
|1980-09-10
|align=left|Ariston Cinema, Sanremo, Italy
|align=left|
|-
|Draw
|
|align=left|Georg Steinherr
|PTS
|12
|1980-05-14
|align=left|Olympiahalle, Munich
|align=left|
|-
|Win
|
|align=left|Gratien Tonna
|PTS
|12
|1980-02-07
|align=left|Stade Pierre de Coubertin, Bercy
|align=left|
|-
|Win
|
|align=left|Tony Sibson
|PTS
|15
|1979-11-06
|align=left|Royal Albert Hall, Kensington, London
|align=left|
|-
|Win
|
|align=left|Abel Cordoba
|PTS
|8
|1979-05-29
|align=left|Royal Albert Hall, Kensington, London
|-
|Loss
|
|align=left|Charlie Weir
|TKO
|7
|1979-02-03
|align=left|Ellis Park Tennis Stadium, Johannesburg
|align=left|
|-
|Loss
|
|align=left|Ayub Kalule
|UD
|10
|1978-12-07
|align=left|K.B. Hallen, Copenhagen
|align=left|
|-
|Win
|
|align=left|Bob Patterson
|PTS
|8
|1978-09-26
|align=left|Empire Pool, Wembley, London
|align=left|
|-
|Loss
|
|align=left|Marvin Hagler
|TKO
|7
|1978-05-13
|align=left|Boston Garden, Boston, Massachusetts
|align=left|
|-
|Loss
|
|align=left|Marvin Hagler
|TKO
|9
|1978-03-04
|align=left|Boston Garden, Boston, Massachusetts
|align=left|
|-
|Loss
|
|align=left|Alan Minter
|PTS
|15
|1977-11-08
|align=left|Empire Pool, Wembley, London
|align=left|
|-
|Win
|
|align=left|Karl Vinson
|PTS
|10
|1977-09-27
|align=left|Empire Pool, Wembley, London
|align=left|
|-
|Win
|
|align=left|Frankie Lucas
|TKO
|11
|1977-05-31
|align=left|Royal Albert Hall, Kensington, London
|align=left|
|-
|Win
|
|align=left|Alex Tompkins
|PTS
|8
|1976-12-07
|align=left|Royal Albert Hall, Kensington, London
|align=left|
|-
|Win
|
|align=left|Oscar Angus
|PTS
|8
|1976-11-15
|align=left|York Hall, Bethnal Green, London
|align=left|
|-
|Loss
|
|align=left|Alan Minter
|PTS
|15
|1976-09-14
|align=left|Royal Albert Hall, Kensington, London
|align=left|
|-
|Win
|
|align=left|Freddy De Kerpel
|KO
|9
|1976-04-10
|align=left|Liege, Belgium
|align=left|
|-
|Win
|
|align=left|Oscar Angus
|PTS
|8
|1976-03-15
|align=left|Hilton Hotel, Mayfair, London
|align=left|
|-
|Win
|
|align=left|Danny McCafferty
|TKO
|4
|1976-02-25
|align=left|York Hall, Bethnal Green, London
|align=left|
|-
|Loss
|
|align=left|Alan Minter
|PTS
|15
|1975-11-04
|align=left|Empire Pool, Wembley, London
|align=left|
|-
|Loss
|
|align=left|Gratien Tonna
|PTS
|15
|1975-05-07
|align=left|Stade Louis II, Monte Carlo, Monaco
|align=left|
|-
|Win
|
|align=left|Frank Reiche
|PTS
|10
|1974-11-12
|align=left|Empire Pool, Wembley, London
|align=left|
|-
|Win
|
|align=left|Eddie Mazon
|TKO
|9
|1974-10-29
|align=left|Royal Albert Hall, Kensington, London
|align=left|
|-
|Win
|
|align=left|Jean-Claude Bouttier
|UD
|15
|1974-05-27
|align=left|Stade Roland Garros, Paris
|align=left|
|-
|Win
|
|align=left|Bunny Sterling
|PTS
|15
|1974-02-11
|align=left|Hilton Hotel, Mayfair, London
|align=left|
|-
|Win
|
|align=left|Frank Young
|PTS
|8
|1973-12-03
|align=left|Anglo-American Sporting Club, Mayfair, London
|align=left|
|-
|Win
|
|align=left|Bob Murphy
|TKO
|4
|1973-10-23
|align=left|Anglo-American Sporting Club, Southend
|align=left|
|-
|Win
|
|align=left|Ronnie Hough
|KO
|8
|1973-05-07
|align=left|Hilton Hotel, Mayfair, London
|align=left|
|-
|Win
|
|align=left|Alvin Anderson
|PTS
|8
|1973-03-27
|align=left|Royal Albert Hall, Kensington, London
|align=left|
|-
|Win
|
|align=left|Leon Washington
|TKO
|7
|1973-03-12
|align=left|Grosvenor House Hotel, Mayfair, London
|align=left|
|-
|Win
|
|align=left|Pat McCann
|PTS
|12
|1973-01-17
|align=left|Hilton Hotel, Mayfair, London
|align=left|
|-
|Win
|
|align=left|Carlos Marks
|PTS
|8
|1972-11-14
|align=left|Empire Pool, Wembley, London
|align=left|
|-
|Win
|
|align=left|Len Gibbs
|RTD
|6
|1972-10-17
|align=left|Hilton Hotel, Mayfair, London
|align=left|
|-
|Win
|
|align=left|Dave Cranswick
|TKO
|3
|1972-09-12
|align=left|Shoreditch Town Hall, Shoreditch, London
|align=left|
|-
|Loss
|
|align=left|Don McMillan
|TKO
|5
|1972-05-24
|align=left|Sporting Club, Bedford
|align=left|
|-
|Win
|
|align=left|Eric Blake
|PTS
|10
|1972-04-10
|align=left|National Sporting Club, Piccadilly, London]
|align=left|
|-
|Win
|
|align=left|Tommy Bell
|PTS
|8
|1972-03-13
|align=left|Anglo-American Sporting Club, Mayfair, London
|align=left|
|-
|Win
|
|align=left|Harry Scott
|PTS
|10
|1972-02-15
|align=left|Royal Albert Hall, Kensington, London
|align=left|
|-
|Win
|
|align=left|Patrick Dwyer
|PTS
|8
|1971-11-16
|align=left|Empire Pool, Wembley, London
|align=left|
|-
|Win
|
|align=left|Mick O'Neill
|TKO
|6
|1971-09-27
|align=left|Empire Pool, Wembley, London
|align=left|
|-
|Loss
|
|align=left|Ronnie Hough
|TKO
|2
|1971-06-14
|align=left|Anglo-American Sporting Club, Mayfair, London
|align=left|
|-
|Win
|
|align=left|Dick Duffy
|PTS
|8
|1971-04-27
|align=left|Royal Albert Hall, Kensington, London
|align=left|
|-
|Win
|
|align=left|Clive Cook
|PTS
|8
|1971-04-06
|align=left|Royal Albert Hall, Kensington, London
|align=left|
|-
|Win
|
|align=left|Dave Ivory
|TKO
|4
|1971-02-10
|align=left|York Hall, Bethnal Green, London
|align=left|
|-
|Win
|
|align=left|Gerald Gooding
|PTS
|6
|1971-01-25
|align=left|Anglo-American Sporting Club, Piccadilly, London
|align=left|
|-
|Win
|
|align=left|Maurice Thomas
|TKO
|6
|1970-12-08
|align=left|Royal Albert Hall, Kensington, London
|align=left|
|-
|Win
|
|align=left|Billy Deasy
|TKO
|4
|1970-11-23
|align=left|Anglo-American Sporting Club, Mayfair, London
|align=left|
|}

See also
List of British middleweight boxing champions
List of European Boxing Union middleweight champions

External links

1948 births
2008 deaths
English male boxers
English people of Irish descent
Middleweight boxers
People from Buckinghamshire